Gregor Young (born 8 February 1966) is a Canadian soccer coach and former professional player.

International career
Young was part of the Canada team that played at the 1985 FIFA World Youth Championship.

He made his senior debut for Canada in an April 1992 friendly match against China. The game remained his only one ever for the senior team aside from a B International against South Korea, also for the men's national team.

Coaching career
He coached five years for Coastal WFC, and is also the Technical Director of Vancouver United FC.

References

External links
 
 CSL Stats

1966 births
Living people
Canadian soccer players
Canada men's international soccer players
Canada men's youth international soccer players
Canadian Soccer League (1987–1992) players
Edmonton Brick Men players
Calgary Kickers players
Vancouver Whitecaps (1986–2010) players
Vancouver Whitecaps (1986–2010) coaches
UBC Thunderbirds soccer players
Association footballers not categorized by position
Canadian soccer coaches